The Beate Uhse Erotic Museum (1996 – 2014) was a sex museum in the Charlottenburg district of Berlin, Germany.

The museum was opened in 1996 near Berlin Zoologischer Garten railway station by Beate Uhse, the early stunt pilot and entrepreneur, who in 1962 started the world's first sex shop. The collection features historic Asian and European erotic art including several lithographs by Heinrich Zille as well as early pornographic films. It claims to be "the world's largest erotic museum".

The museum closed in September 2014. Initially the museum was looking for new premises, but due to the market development in Berlin the museum never reopened. For the exhibits, a loss in value of €1.2 million was recorded in the 2015 annual report.

See also
List of sex museums

References

"In Berlin, the Art of Sex", by Marianna Beck and Jack Hafferkamp. The Washington Post, April 18, 1999.

Museums in Berlin
Defunct museums in Germany
Museums established in 1996
Museums disestablished in 2014
Buildings and structures in Charlottenburg-Wilmersdorf
Sex museums in Germany
Uhse, Beate
Women's museums
Women and sexuality
1996 establishments in Germany
2014 disestablishments in Germany
History of women in Germany